Tiquadra etiennei is a moth of the family Tineidae. It is endemic to Réunion island in the Indian Ocean.

See also
 List of moths of Réunion

References

Hapsiferinae
Endemic fauna of Réunion
Moths described in 1988
Moths of Réunion